Environmental Life Force (ELF), also known as the Original ELF, was the first radical environmental group in 1977 to use explosive and incendiary devices to advance their agenda.

History

The original ELF was founded by John Clark Hanna. who was the only member of the group to be arrested and convicted for the use of explosives on federal property. The ELF conducted armed actions in northern California and Oregon and disbanded in 1978 following Hanna's arrest.

The group claimed that warfare designed pesticides were being used on domestic crops, specifically a chemical banned after its extensive use in Vietnam. A communique to The Independent later provided the group with a frontpage story. They also called for above-ground organizations to initiate a boycott of sprayed food and for the public to criticize the process, with the following claim that.

There was also an article published in Open Road in August 1977 featuring the bombing at a paper publishing company in Oregon City. The target was a company who the ELF claimed were responsible for using a dangerous chemical called Tordon for aerial spraying, used as part of a program in Vietnam and responsible for causing cancer and birth defects.

References

External links
 Q&A with Original ELF founder, John Hanna
 Environmental Life Force

Environmental organizations based in the United States
Radical environmentalism
Eco-terrorism